Mstislav may refer to:

 Mstislav (given name), a Slavic origin given name
 Mstislav Rostropovich, a Russian cellist
 Mistislaw (Obotrite prince), a leader of the Obotrite Slavs in the region of modern Mecklenburg and Holstein in northern Germany
 an alternate spelling of Mstsislaw, a town in Mahilyow Voblast, eastern Belarus

pl:Mścisław